Kolobopetalum is a genus of flowering plants belonging to the family Menispermaceae.

Its native range is Western and Western Central Tropical Africa.

Species:

Kolobopetalum auriculatum 
Kolobopetalum chevalieri 
Kolobopetalum leonense 
Kolobopetalum ovatum

References

Menispermaceae
Menispermaceae genera